Val Jeanty, also known as Val-Inc, is a Haitian electronic music composer, turntablist, and professor at Berklee College of Music who evokes the musical esoteric realms of the creative subconscious self-defined as “Afro-Electronica.” She incorporates her African Haitian musical traditions into the present and beyond, combining acoustics with electronics and the archaic with the post-modern. Jeanty is a pioneer of the electronic music subgenre Afro- Electronica also called "Vodou-Electro".

Early years
Jeanty is the great-grandniece of Haitian composer, pianist, and music director Occide Jeanty and granddaughter of GranMe Shoun mambo (Vodou priestess). Growing up in Bizoton Fontamara, Haiti, Jeanty attended Sacré Cœur. Jeanty left Haiti for the United States in 1986, when upheaval following the overthrow of then-president Jean-Claude Duvalier led to school closures.

Career
Jeanty issued her first album in 2000 thanks to a Van Lier Fellowship, and has performed at the Whitney Museum, the Museum of Modern Art, and internationally at music festivals in Austria and Switzerland. Jeanty's installations have been showcased in New York City at the Whitney Museum, the Museum of Modern Art, the Brooklyn Academy of Music, the Village Vanguard and internationally at Saalfelden Music Festival in Austria, Stanser Musiktage in Switzerland, Jazz à la Villette in France, and the Biennale Di Venezia in Italy.

Poet Tracie Morris chose Jeanty as the sound engineer for her 2002 poetry installation at the Whitney Biennial. Morris and Jeanty worked in Jeanty's home studio, even recording the poems in a vestibule between two rooms.

In 2011, Jeanty was commissioned by Wesleyan University's Center for the arts to collaborate with Dr. Gina Athena Ulysse on Fascinating! Her resilience, a multimedia performance exploring the meanings assigned to the word "resilience" in Western conceptualizations of Haitians after the earthquake of January 2010.

Jeanty speaks about the relationship between sound and spirituality in the 2012 documentary film The United States of Hoodoo.

In 2014, Jeanty collaborated with Afro-Cuban Saxophonist Yosvany Terry on his album  New Throned King (5Passion), contributing samplings of vodou ceremonies. The same year, she was also sound designer for the National Black Theater's Facing Our Truth: 10-Minute Plays on Trayvon, Race and Privilege.

Jeanty's most recent work is with Turning Jewels Into Water, a duo with Indian-born Ravish Momin. With influences including Vodou, Indian folk music, jazz, and electronica, Turning Jewels Into Water has been said to "actively decentre shallow, Westernized understandings of 'world' music", and their 2019 debut Map of Absences called "a place where the ritualistic origins of music and rhythm meet with the digital realm." Turning Jewels Into Water was also awarded a 2020 New Music USA grant. Their newest work, Our Reflection Adorned by Newly Formed Stars, was completed after the start of the pandemic, with the duo recording and sharing files at a distance.

Discography

As leader

As sideperson

As writer/arranger

As sound engineer

External links 
 A Lady Named Val-Inc: VFH InnerView (VoicesfromHaïti)

References 

Haitian artists
Haitian women
Haitian emigrants to the United States
Haitian Vodou practitioners
Haitian Vodou researchers
1970s births
Living people
People from Port-au-Prince
Haitian musicians
Haitian DJs
21st-century women musicians
Women in electronic music